The Hungary national under-17 football team represents Hungary in association football at under-17 age level and is controlled by the Hungarian Football Federation, the governing body for football in Hungary. The current manager of the team is Sándor Preisinger.

Competition history

UEFA U-16/17 European Championship record

FIFA U-17 World Cup record

Recent results

2022 UEFA European Under-17 Championship qualification
Qualifying round

Elite round

Players

Current squad
 The following players were called up for the friendly matches.
 Match dates: 29 November and 1 December 2022
 Opposition: 
Caps and goals correct as of: 19 October 2022, after the match against .

Recent callups
The following players have been selected by Hungary in the past 12 months.

Coaching staff

See also
 Hungary national football team
 Hungary national under-21 football team
 Hungary national under-19 football team

References

External links
 Hungary national under-17 football team information, profile and news on the Hungarian Football Federation official website

 

under-17
European national under-17 association football teams